Ebrima "EJ" Jatta (born February 18, 1987) is a Gambian former footballer.

Career
Jatta played college soccer at Bellevue College between 2010 and 2011. Before this he had played in his native Gambia for Banjul Hawks FC and in Finland for FC Futura.

After his two-year spell at college, Jatta had trials with Reading and Norwich City, but wasn't signed by either club.

Jatta signed his first professional contract with USL Professional Division club Los Angeles Blues on March 7, 2012.

References

1987 births
Living people
Sportspeople from Banjul
Gambian footballers
Association football midfielders
Association football defenders
Orange County SC players
USL Championship players
Gambian expatriate footballers
Gambian expatriate sportspeople in the United States
Expatriate soccer players in the United States